Tanya Aguiñiga (born 1978, San Diego, California) is a Los Angeles-based artist, designer, and activist.

Early life and education 
Although she was born in the United States, Aguiñiga spent her childhood living in Tijuana, Mexico. From ages 4 to 18, she travelled several hours daily across the border to attend school in San Diego, an experience that would influence her later life and work. She went on to receive a BA in Applied Design from San Diego State University and an MFA in furniture design from Rhode Island Institute of Design.

Art and design career 

Aguiñiga began designing furniture in 1997 while she was still an undergraduate student. Her first design job was working as a designer and fabricator off-camera for the DIY Network show called Freeform Furniture. Throughout her career, Aguiñiga's work has taken many forms but remains generally textile-centric, often combining modern design with elements of traditional craft technique and activism. Using a range of natural materials from beeswax to wool to human hair, Aguiñiga crafts furniture, textiles, wearable pieces, sculptures, and site-specific installations. In addition to designing furniture, jewelry, and other small scale pieces, she has extended her design mediums to fiber and creates weavings with materials such as woven jute, wool, silk, and cotton. She manages a team of nearly all female assistants in the creation of large format wall , woven hangings, by commission.

Aguiñiga's work has been featured in the PBS series Craft in America and in a 2011 site-specific exhibition at the Craft and Folk Art Museum, among many other venues. Fashion designer Ulla Johnson, commissioned a piece by Aguiñiga for her shop in New York.

From July 23 through September 17, 2016, Aguiñiga's "Teetering of the Marginal" accompanied pieces by Lenore Tawney and Loie Hollowell in a gallery exhibit titled 3 Women. The 1977 film 3 Women, written and directed by Robert Altman and starring Shelley Duvall, Sissy Spacek, and Janice Rule, provided inspiration to The Landing to gather the artists for the exhibit.

In May through October 2018 Aguiñiga had a solo exhibition of her work at the Museum of Arts and Design in New York City titled "Tanya Aguiñiga: Craft and Care". The show prominently featured her project AMBOS ("Art Made Between Opposite Sides"), that addresses life on the Mexican-American border. In Spanish "ambos" means both and according to the project's website the mission of AMBOS is to "express and document border emotion through art made on opposite sides by providing a platform to bi-national artists along the border." Her work was also featured in Disrupting Craft: Renwick Invitational 2018 at the Smithsonian American Art Museum's Renwick Gallery.

In 2021, Aguiñiga received the 26th Annual Heinz Award for the Arts.

In early 2022, Aguiñiga lead a social justice focused BIPOC Exchange at the newly reopened Frieze Los Angeles.

Aguiñiga, along with fourteen other artists of Latin American and Caribbean descent, was named Latinx Artists Fellows in 2022.

Aguiñiga's work was also featured in the Armory Show in 2022 as it moved to the Javits Center.

Her work, Metabolizing the Border, was acquired by the Smithsonian American Art Museum as part of the Renwick Gallery's 50th Anniversary Campaign.

Activism 
Aguiñiga is responsible for multiple "performance crafting" happenings, including tying herself to the Beverly Hills sign and weaving while wearing traditional Mexican garments.

Having grown up on the U.S./Mexico boarder, Aguiñiga uses her life experiences in connection with her craft practice to promote collective creation within communities, spearheading art-based advocacy projects including the Border Art Workshop/Taler de Arte Fronterizo in Maclovio Rojas, Mexico, and AMBOS (Art Made Between Opposite Sides), spanning the US-Mexico border, which seeks to document the emotions of commuters crossing it and gives voice to bi-national artists.

Collections 

 Museum of Fine Arts, Houston
 Los Angeles County Museum of Art

References

Living people
1978 births
Mexican women artists
Artists from Baja California
People from Tijuana
Mexican activists
Mexican women activists
Women textile artists
American artists of Mexican descent
Mexican textile artists
Women woodworkers
American woodworkers
American furniture makers
American furniture designers